Eliezer Manoach Palchinsky (November 18, 1912 – October 6, 2007), also spelled Paltzinsky, Platchinsky and Platinsky, was a rosh yeshiva in Jerusalem for nearly 60 years.

Biography
He was born on 28 Cheshvan 5673 (November 18, 1912) in the town of Vishki, Vitebsk Governorate, at the time in the Russian Empire, today in Latvia. His father, Rabbi Shlomo Yehuda Leib Palchinsky, was the av beis din (head of the rabbinical court) of Vishki. Palchinsky's maternal grandfather was Rabbi Nosson Tzvi Finkel (the Alter of Slabodka).

At age 10 Palchinsky traveled to Riga, where he learned under Rabbi Menachem Mendel Zaks, the Rav of that city, for a year. At age 11 he returned home to study with his father until his bar mitzvah. During his teens, he learned for three years at Yeshivas Knesses Yisrael in Slabodka, Lithuania. During this period, Rabbi Meir Simcha (the Ohr Somayach), Rav of Dvinsk, died and Palchinsky's father succeeded him in the city's rabbinate. Palchinsky would spend every Pesach intercession break in Dvinsk, where he maintained a regular study session with the Rogatchover Gaon. His close relationship with the Rogatchover Gaon continued for 10 years, until the latter's death.

Palchinsky went on to study for a year and half in Riga under Rabbi Mordechai Pogramsky, and four years at the Mir yeshiva in Poland, where he became known as an outstanding student. In 1937, he was selected by the rosh yeshiva, Rabbi Eliezer Yehuda Finkel, to join an elite group of Mir students sent to learn under the Brisker Rav in Brisk. This group included Rabbi Aryeh Leib Malin and the Brisker Rav's future son-in-law, Rabbi Yechiel Michel Feinstein. Palchinsky became a protégé of the Brisker Rav, a relationship which continued when the two arrived in Jerusalem. Afterwards Palchinsky returned to the Slabodka yeshiva.

Palchinsky survived the Holocaust through the efforts of Rabbi Mordecai Dubin, an Agudath Israel activist. He immigrated to Mandatory Palestine in 1940. In the early 1940s he studied together with other noteworthy scholars such as Rabbi Shneur Kotler, Rabbi Chaim Kreiswirth, and Rabbi Elazar Goldschmidt.

In 1944 he married Ettel, the daughter of Rabbi Aryeh Levin, a prominent figure in the Old Yishuv in Jerusalem. This match made him a brother-in-law to Rabbi Yosef Shalom Elyashiv. He and his wife had six daughters and one son.

In the mid-1940s, Palchinsky undertook a correspondence of over 80 letters with the Chazon Ish of Bnei Brak. In 1946, his uncle, Rabbi Issac Sher, called on him to re-establish the Slabodka Yeshiva in Bnei Brak. In 1948, he joined the staff of Yeshivas Beis Aryeh, founded by his father-in-law, Rabbi Aryeh Levin, in Jerusalem. Levin asked that Palchinsky be appointed rosh yeshiva. In addition to teaching in the yeshiva, Palchinsky delivered mussar (ethics) talks to students from Hebron Yeshiva and Mir Yeshiva. These students included Rabbi Aviezer Piltz, Rabbi Baruch Mordechai Ezrachi, Rabbi Mattisyahu Solomon, Rabbi Nosson Tzvi Finkel, Rabbi Chaim Sarna, and Rabbi Moshe Shapiro. During the 1948 War of Independence, Palchinsky delivered shiurim at Yeshivas Heichal HaTalmud in Tel Aviv.

In the 1960s and 1970s, Palchinsky also served as rosh yeshiva of the Tomchei Temimim system in Kfar Chabad and Lod. In 1972 he was asked to deliver a shiur klali (general lecture) in Yeshivas HaNegev and its kollel. Palchinsky established Kollel Shalom Yehuda in Kiryat Sanz, Jerusalem, in memory of his father.

He died on October 6, 2007, at the age of 94. He was buried on the Mount of Olives.

Works
Palchinsky published two Talmudic works, one on Seder Nashim and one on Seder Moed, each entitled Shalom Yehuda in memory of his father. He also left unpublished writings.

References

External links
Pictures of Rabbi Eliezer Palchinsky in "The Brisker Rav"
Yeshiva Beis Aryeh 
 Photo of Rabbi Eliezer Palachinsky delivering a lecture on Tractate Kiddushin 

Rosh yeshivas
Latvian Orthodox rabbis
Haredi rabbis in Israel
People from Daugavpils Municipality
20th-century rabbis in Jerusalem
21st-century rabbis in Jerusalem
1912 births
2007 deaths
Burials at the Jewish cemetery on the Mount of Olives
Mir Yeshiva alumni